The Battle of Holmec (Serbian: Bitka za Holmeka; Slovenian: Bitka za Holmec) was one of the bloodiest clashes during the Ten-Day War. The Yugoslav People's Army tried to take the border post of Holmec after a brief ultimatum. The units were the Slovenian Police and territorial defense on the one hand and members of the JNA on the other hand who were supposed to occupy the border crossing. 220 members of the territorial defense and 40 policemen participated, against 62 members of the JNA. The TO were commanded by Max Gorenšek and the JNA was commanded by Meh Rajko.

Battle 
The 115th anti-sabotage company, the 1st company of the 62nd Carinthian detachment, the 1st platoon of the 97th assault detachment, the 160th anti-sabotage platoon and the 32nd anti-aircraft battery of the Slovenian TO were present at the battle. The 31st JNA corps was also present at the battle. 45 JNA were captured and several surrendered. 2 Slovenian police officers were killed in the battle. The Holmec watchtower fell around 10 a.m. to Slovenian TO.

Aftermath 
On the 28 June 1991, Slovenian TO members were filmed on the Austrian public broadcasting station ORF. Video footage shows a small group of JNA soldiers standing or walking slowly with raised hands, holding up a white sheet in an apparent attempt to surrender. Moments later, gunfire is heard and the soldiers fall or jump to the ground. Holmec was the first border post in Slovenia to be liberated during the Ten-Day War. Many Slovenian high-ranking officers left the JNA after the battle.

References 

Ten-Day War
Battles
